George Salesbury or Salusbury (fl. 1545) was a Welsh politician.

He was a Member (MP) of the Parliament of England for Denbigh Boroughs in 1545.

References

Year of birth missing
Year of death missing
16th-century Welsh politicians
Members of the Parliament of England (pre-1707) for constituencies in Wales
English MPs 1545–1547